The 2016–17 All-Ireland Intermediate Club Hurling Championship was the 13th staging of the All-Ireland Intermediate Club Hurling Championship, the Gaelic Athletic Association's intermediate inter-county club hurling tournament. The championship began on 22 October 2016 and ended on 18 February 2017.

On 18 February 2017, Carrickshock won the championship following a 2–15 to 0–6 defeat of Ahascragh-Fohenagh in the final.

Connacht Intermediate Club Hurling Championship

Connacht semi-final

Connacht final

Leinster Intermediate Club Hurling Championship

Leinster quarter-finals

Leinster semi-finals

Leinster final

Munster Intermediate Club Hurling Championship

Munster quarter-finals

Munster semi-finals

Munster final

Ulster Intermediate Club Hurling Championship

Ulster quarter-final

Ulster semi-finals

Ulster final

All-Ireland Intermediate Club Hurling Championship

All-Ireland quarter-final

All-Ireland semi-finals

All-Ireland final

Championship statistics

Top scorers

Overall

References

All-Ireland Intermediate Club Hurling Championship
All-Ireland Intermediate Club Hurling Championship
2016